Manuel Agustín Peypoch (12 April 1912 – 24 March 1997) was a Spanish field hockey player. He competed in the 1948 Summer Olympics.

He was a member of the Spanish field hockey team, which was eliminated in the group stage. He played all three matches as halfback in the tournament. He was born in Barcelona, where he also died.

References

External links
 
profile
Manuel Agustín's obituary 

1912 births
1997 deaths
Spanish male field hockey players
Olympic field hockey players of Spain
Field hockey players at the 1948 Summer Olympics